Dollond may refer to:
Dollond (crater), lunar crater

People with the surname Dollond
John Dollond (1706–1761), English optician
Peter Dollond (1731–1821), English optician, son of John
George Dollond (1774–1852), English optician, nephew of Peter

See also
Dollond & Aitchison, British retail opticians founded 1750, absorbed by Boots Opticians 2009